The 2006–07 ISU Grand Prix of Figure Skating was a series of international invitational competitions in the first half of the 2006–07 figure skating season. Skaters competed in the disciplines of men's singles, ladies' singles, pairs, and ice dancing over six events. Skaters earned a certain number of points per placement and the top six scoring skaters at the end of the series qualified for the 2006–07 Grand Prix of Figure Skating Final.

The Grand Prix series set the stage for the 2007 European Figure Skating Championships, the 2007 Four Continents Figure Skating Championships, the 2007 World Junior Figure Skating Championships, and the 2007 World Figure Skating Championships, as well as each country's national championships. The Grand Prix series began on 26 October 2006 and ended on 17 December 2006.

The Grand Prix was organized by the International Skating Union. Skaters competed for prize money and for a chance to compete in the Grand Prix Final. The corresponding series for Junior-level skaters was the 2006–07 ISU Junior Grand Prix.

Qualifying
Skaters who reached the age of 14 by July 1, 2006 were eligible to compete on the senior Grand Prix circuit. The top six skaters from the 2006 World Figure Skating Championships were seeded and were guaranteed two events. Skaters who placed 7th through 12th were also given two events, though they were not considered seeded.

Skaters/teams who medaled at the 2005–06 Junior Grand Prix Final or the 2006 World Junior Figure Skating Championships were guaranteed one event. Skaters were medaled at both the Junior Grand Prix Final and the World Junior Championships were guaranteed only one event.

The host country was allowed to send three skaters/teams of their choosing in each discipline.

Medal summary

Non-scoring event

Points
After the final event, the NHK Trophy, the six skaters/teams with the most points advanced to the Grand Prix Final. The point system was as follows:

If a pairs team competed in more than two events, the teams who scored below them in their non-scoring competition did not automatically move up in gaining points. For example, if Team A placed second below Team B, and it was Team B's non-scoring event, Team A still earned 13 points, not 15.

Skaters had to compete in two events to qualify for the Final.

Final points
Skaters in bold qualified for the Grand Prix Final.

Prize money
The total prize money is $180,000 per individual event and $272,000 for the Final. All amounts are in U.S. dollars. Pairs and dance teams split the money. The breakdown is as follows:

References

External links

Isu Grand Prix Of Figure Skating, 2006-07
ISU Grand Prix of Figure Skating